Louisa Lee Schuyler (October 26, 1837 – October 10, 1926) was an early American leader in charitable work, particularly noted for founding the first nursing school in the United States.

Charitable work 
During the Civil War, at the relatively young age of 24, Schuyler was appointed as the corresponding secretary in the Woman's Central Association of Relief (WCAR) in New York City. The mission of WCAR was to coordinate the efforts of the volunteers on the home front, including distribution of millions of dollars of supplies, and providing training materials.

In 1873 she organized the New York State Charities Aid Association and in the following year established the first training school for nurses in the United States in connection with Bellevue Hospital. She also worked on projects to address tuberculosis and blindness. In 1907 she was appointed one of the original trustees of the Russell Sage Foundation, founded by Margaret Olivia Slocum Sage.

Recognition 
In recognition of her 40 years of activity in charitable work, she received in 1915 the honorary degree of Doctor of Laws from Columbia University. In 2000, the State Charities Aid Association was renamed the Schuyler Center for Analysis and Advocacy in her honor.

Family and personal life 
Schuyler was the great-great-granddaughter of Gen. Philip Schuyler and the great-granddaughter of Alexander Hamilton, and the granddaughter of James Alexander Hamilton.

Schuyler never married, living with her sister Georgina for most of her adult life. She died shortly before her 89th birthday.

References

External links 

 

1837 births
1926 deaths
Activists from New York City
Women in the American Civil War
Schuyler family
Alexander Hamilton
People of New York (state) in the American Civil War